Citizen Dog may refer to:

 Citizen Dog (comic strip), an American newspaper comic strip
 Citizen Dog (film), a 2004 Thai film

See also
 Citizen (disambiguation)